Alejandro Bender (born 21 April 1976) is an Argentine judoka. He competed at the 1996 Summer Olympics and the 2000 Summer Olympics.

References

External links
 

1976 births
Living people
Argentine male judoka
Olympic judoka of Argentina
Judoka at the 1996 Summer Olympics
Judoka at the 2000 Summer Olympics
Place of birth missing (living people)